Stevan Šalajić (: 23 June 1929 – 1 July 2002) was a Serbian actor.

Selected filmography

Film

References

External links

Serbian male actors
Male actors from Belgrade
1929 births
2002 deaths
Laureates of the Ring of Dobrica